Rodney James Baxter FRS FAA (born 8 February 1940 in London, United Kingdom) is an Australian physicist, specialising in statistical mechanics. He is well known for his work in exactly solved models, in particular vertex models such as the six-vertex model and eight-vertex model, and the chiral Potts model and hard hexagon model. A recurring theme in the solution of such models, the Yang–Baxter equation, also known as the "star–triangle relation", is named in his honour.

Biography 

Baxter was educated at Bancroft's School and Trinity College, Cambridge (BA, MA), before relocating to the Australian National University in Canberra to complete his PhD. He was among the first doctoral graduates in theoretical physics from the ANU, graduating in 1964. Then, in 1964 and 1965, he worked for the Iraq Petroleum Company. He worked as an assistant professor at the Massachusetts Institute of Technology from 1968 until 1970, when he took up a position at the ANU, and served a term as the Head of the Department of Theoretical Physics in the Institute of Advanced Study, until he retired in 2002. He is currently the Emeritus Professor of Physics. In 1984, he was awarded a Doctor of Science by Cambridge. He is a Fellow of the Australian Academy of Science, Royal Society of London, and the Isaac Newton Institute, Cambridge, where he was Royal Society Research Professor in 1992. In 1980 he was awarded the Boltzmann Medal, the main recognition for research contribution concerning statistical mechanics. In 2006, he was awarded the Lars Onsager Prize "For his original and groundbreaking contributions to the field of exactly solved models in statistical mechanics, which continue to inspire profound developments in statistical physics and related fields".

Research 
Baxter gained recognition in 1971 when he used the star-triangle relation to calculate the free energy of the eight-vertex model, and went on to similarly solve the hard hexagon model (1980) and the chiral Potts model in 1988. He also developed the corner transfer matrix method for calculating the order parameters of the eight-vertex and similar models. In 2005 he used the method of Michio Jimbo, Tetsuji Miwa and Nakayashiki to verify Albertini, McCoy, Perk and Tang's conjecture for the order parameter of the chiral Potts model.

His use of the Yang–Baxter equation led to the formulation and the study of representations of the quantum group by Vladimir Drinfeld in the 1980s, and quantum generalisations of affine algebras, and they are quasi-triangular Hopf algebras which yield solutions of the Yang–Baxter equation and provide insight into the properties of corresponding statistical models.

His book, Exactly solved models in statistical mechanics, has received over 4000 citations (according to Web of Science) in subsequent work in statistical mechanics and the study of quantum groups, and is used widely in teaching at universities.

Awards and honours 
Pawsey Medal, Australian Academy of Science, 1975
Boltzmann Medal, IUPAP, 1980
Thomas Ranken Lyle Medal, Australian Academy of Science, 1983
Dannie Heineman Prize for Mathematical Physics, American Physical Society, 1987
Harrie Massey Medal and Prize, Australian Institute of Physics / Institute of Physics (UK), 1994
Fellow of the Australian Academy of Science, 1977
Fellow of the Royal Society of London, 1982
Centenary Medal, Australian Government, 2003
Lars Onsager Prize, American Physical Society, 2006
Royal Medal, 2013
Henri Poincaré Prize, 2021

Publications

References 
 V. Chari and A.N. Pressley, A Guide to Quantum Groups Cambridge University Press, 1994

External links 
2006 Onsager Prize, www.physorg.com
History of theoretical physics at ANU
Elected FAA 1977, science.org.au
Elected FRS 1982, royalsociety.org
Royal Medal 2013, www.austms.org.au

1940 births
Living people
Baxter
Baxter
Fellows of the Royal Society
Royal Medal winners
British emigrants to Australia